Philip F. Coridan   (August 19, 1858 – July 1, 1915) was a 19th-century professional baseball second baseman and outfielder. He played for the Chicago Browns in the Union Association in two games in July 1884. He had one hit in seven at-bats in his two games.

External links

Major League Baseball second basemen
Major League Baseball outfielders
Chicago Browns/Pittsburgh Stogies players
19th-century baseball players
Baseball players from Indiana
1858 births
1915 deaths
Fort Wayne Hoosiers players
Birmingham (minor league baseball) players
Elkhart (minor league baseball) players